Anon (stylised as -Anon.) is the fourth studio album by Australian rock band Hands Like Houses, released on 12 October 2018 by UNFD and Hopeless Records. It was produced by Colin Brittain, Mike Green, Alex Prieto, and Erik Ron at Steakhouse Studios in Hollywood.

Background
Anon is a quasi-concept album that ventures beyond the band's personal experiences. Hands Like Houses wanted to tell a different kind of narrative with their fourth album, wanting to tell the stories of other people through their music, ranging from a tale of self discovery, to relationships or politics. It was made to be relatable to anyone who listened to it.

Promotion and singles
The album's first single, "Overthinking", was also released on 26 July 2018. The single's accompanying music video was also released on the same day. The album's second single, "Monster", was released on 13 August with its accompanying music video being released a day later. Their third single of the album, "Sick", was released on 22 January 2019, alongside its accompanying music video.

Hands Like Houses performed a national six-date tour to promote the album for February 2019. They played across the major capital cities. Playing as support for the band was Ocean Grove, Endless Heights, and RedHook.

Critical reception

The album was met with generally favourable reviews. Megan Langley of KillYourStereo in an 85/100 review, praised the band's new sound citing it as "an evolution for the Aussie locals." Michael Parente of Wall of Sound in a 7.5/10 review, noted that the album sounded different from their previous album Dissonants, but it was a welcomed change. The album peaked at No. 4 on the ARIA Charts on 20 October.

Track listing
Track listing adapted from AllMusic.

Personnel
Credits adapted from AllMusic.

Hands Like Houses
 Trenton Woodley – lead vocals, keyboards
 Matt Cooper – lead guitar
 Alexander Pearson – rhythm guitar, backing vocals
 Joel Tyrrell – bass guitar, backing vocals
 Matt Parkitny – drums

Production
 Colin Brittain - additional production, composer, mixer, producer, programming, synthesizer
 Erik Ron - composer, producer
 Brendan Collins - assistant engineer, guitar technician
 Jonathan Gering - additional production, programming, synthesizer
 Mike Green - composer, producer
 Leeanna James - composer 
 Mike Kalajian - mastering 
 John Nicholson - drum technician
 Callan Orr - additional Production, composer, programming, synthesizer 
 David Peters - assistant engineer
 Ryan Potesta - assistant engineer
 Alex Prieto - additional production, engineer, mixing, producer, programming, synthesizer
 Anthony Reeder - engineer
 Erik Ron - composer, producer 
 James Paul Wisner - mixing

Charts

References

2018 albums
Hands Like Houses albums
UNFD albums
Hopeless Records albums
Albums produced by Colin Brittain
Albums produced by Erik Ron